South Halmahera Regency is a regency of North Maluku Province, Indonesia.  It lies partly on Halmahera Island and partly on smaller islands to the west and south of Halmahera. It covers a land area of 8,779.320 km2, and at the 2010 Census it had a population of 198,911 people, while the 2020 Census showed that this had risen to 248,395 and the official estimate in mid 2021 was 251,690. The capital lies at the town of Labuha on Bacan Island.

Islands
Besides the southern part of Halmahera Island, the regency includes a number of archipelagoes and islands. These comprise:
 Obi Islands, including Obira (main), Bisa, Obilatu and other small islands, comprising in all five kecamatan with 51,510 people in mid 2021.
 Bacan Islands, including: 
 Bacan Island itself, comprising 7 kecamatan with 84,011 people (in mid 2021)
 Bacan Lomang Island, comprising 1 kecamatan with 7,735 people
 Mandioli, comprising 2 kecamatan with 10,843 people
 Kasiruta, comprising 2 kecamatan with 10,813 people
 Kayoa Group, comprising 4 kecamatan with 23,226 people
 Makian, comprising 2 kecamatan with 14,019 people
 Joronga Islands, comprising 1 kecamatan with 7,248 people, including the southern tip of Halmahera Island
 the southern peninsula of Halmahera Island (the area is known as Gane), comprising 6 kecamatan with 42,185 people.

Administration 
The regency is divided into thirty districts (kecamatan), tabulated below with their areas and their populations at the 2010 Census and 2020 Census, together with the official estimates for mid 2021. The table also includes the name of the administrative centre and the number of administrative villages (desa and kelurahan) and named islands in each district and its post code.

Notes: (a) formally called Kepulauan Batanglomang; situated between Bacan and Mandioli Islands. (b) includes Lata Lata Island (27.9 km2, with 1,201 inhabitants in 2020), located to the northwest of Kasiruta Island, and comprising two desa - Lata Lata and Sidanga. (c) Kayoa Barat (essentially Pulau Muari, but also includes the four small offshore islets of Pulau Guaigo, Pulau Guaigo Kecil, Pulau Intan and Pulau Tamotamo) actually lies closer to Kasiruta Island than to the rest of the Kayoa group; it is geographically adjacent to Lata Lata Island, part of Kasiruta Barat District.

Languages
The various South Halmahera languages are a branch of Austronesian languages.

Economy
South Halmahera has been designated by provincial governor Abdul Ghani Kasuba as a region for tourism development. The Widi International Fishing Tournament was founded for this purpose. Kasuba also successfully negotiated for the China-based Jinchun Group to build a nine-trillion rupiah nickel smelter in the Obi Islands.

References

External links
 

Regencies of North Maluku
Halmahera